Madan M. Rehani is an Indian-born medical physicist.

Employment and voluntary positions
Madan Rehani is currently director of global outreach for radiation protection at the Massachusetts General Hospital, Harvard Medical School, Boston, US, and an adjunct professor at the Duke University Medical Center, Durham, NC, US. He worked earlier for over 11 years at the International Atomic Energy Agency (IAEA), Vienna, Austria. 
He was professor and head of medical physics at the All India Institute of Medical Sciences (AIIMS), New Delhi, India, before joining the IAEA in 2001. He was also head of the World Health Organization’s (WHO) Collaborating Centre on Imaging Technology & Radiation Protection, which he established in 1997. He held faculty positions at different levels from 1977-2001 in different medical institutes in India.
He is currently president (2018-2021) of the International Organization for Medical Physics (IOMP). He is a member of the International Commission on Radiological Protection (ICRP). Under his chairmanship, 4 Annals of the ICRP have been published, and another 4 with him as member of the Task Group. 
He is senior editor of The British Journal of Radiology, associate editor of Medical Physics and was assistant editor of American Journal of Roentgenology for several years.

Work on Radiation Protection
Rehani has made contributions in patient dosimetry in over 70 countries by his actions through the International Atomic Energy Agency (IAEA). He established a website on radiation protection of patients; the smart card project for tracking radiation exposures of patients; research on radiation-induced cataract in the eyes of interventional cardiologists and support staff; research on radiation safety of children in developing countries; development of training material on radiation protection; and training of doctors using fluoroscopy outside radiology (cardiologists, urologists, orthopedic surgeons, vascular surgeons, gastroenterologist, and gynecologists) from over 60 countries. He also set up the EuroSafe Imaging program by the European Society of Radiology. He has recently developed a new concept on “acceptable quality dose (AQD)” to take into account limitations of diagnostic reference levels (DRLs), which have been used as an index in radiation protection for nearly three decades. He is currently Chair of the Program Committee of the IAEA International Conference on Radiation Protection in Medicine.

Honors and awards
During his tenure at the IAEA, a certificate was awarded to Madan Rehani to commemorate the 2005 Nobel Peace Prize, which was jointly awarded to the Head of the IAEA and to the IAEA. Staff members whose work was included in the citation (e.g. “safe use of radiation” in the case of Rehani), were awarded a certificate with a copy of the original prize; the prize money was donated to a cancer fund charity.

Rehani was chosen among 50 medical physicists who have made outstanding contributions in the world over the last 50 years (1963–2013) and honored at the International Conference on Medical Physics in Brighton, UK on 1–4 September 2013. He received the 2015 Butterfly Award from the Alliance for Radiation Safety in Pediatric Imaging.

He was elected as Fellow of the International Organization for Medical Physics (IOMP) in 2013,  and awarded Honorary Membership of the Society for Pediatric Radiology in May 2011, the Dr. N.C. Singhal Oration by the Association of Medical Physicists of India (Northern Chapter) in April 2011, the Harold Johns Medal by the International Organization for Medical Physics (IOMP) in 2009, the Dr. K.M. Rai Oration by the Indian Radiological & Imaging Association in 2001, and the Homi Bhabha Memorial Oration by the Society of Nuclear Medicine India in 1999.

Rehani was president of the Association of Medical Physicists of India (UPDEL Chapter) from 1990 to 1994, president of the Society of Nuclear Medicine, India in 2001, Fellow of the Indian College of Nuclear Medicine, and secretary of the College from 1997-2001.

Publications
The following is a list of selected publications. He has edited 5 books, is responsible for 15 IAEA publications, 8 Annals of ICRP, published more than 130 papers in peer reviewed journals and contributed Editorials in British Medical Journal, International Journal of Cardiology, and Indian Journal of Radiology & Imaging. An exhaustive publication list can be found on Rehani's Google Scholar page.

Media coverage
 Concerns emerge about EU radiation safety directive - AuntMinnieEurope
 YouTube videos weigh threat of CT radiation exposure - DiagnosticImaging
 IAEA Calls for Enhanced Radiation Protection of Patients - CNN
 Cataract Risk Points to Need for Better Safety Measures - RSNA
 Overview of media coverage regarding radiation exposure to patients during interventional procedures
 ESR's EuroSafe Imaging campaign promotes radiation protection
 RPOP celebrates sending the 100th update to its subscribers

References

20th-century Indian medical doctors
Living people
Year of birth missing (living people)
Medical physicists
Indian radiologists